Rasmus Thude (born in Aarhus, Denmark on 26 March 1989) is a Danish singer and songwriter with more than 20 million plays worldwide. He has previously participated in the Danish X Factor in 2010. In January 2011 his song LLL (Love, Liquor, Lick It) got him worldwide attention when it was mistaken with the American singer, Justin Timberlake. The song had been renamed "Take You Down" and both media and fans thought it was a new single from JT. In 2014 Rasmus Thude enrolled at DTU (Danish Technical University) studying Processing and Innovation. In 2015 he created his first app start-up "Ta' det", where he is currently working as CEO.

Music
In 2011 Rasmus Thude signed with Instant Major Management and later that same year he signed his first labeldeal with Sony Music Denmark. In March 2012, he was appointed "Big in 2012" by the Danish music magazine GAFFA. He released his debut EP Seks hjerter in November 2012 on Sony Music.

In June 2011, he released his first single, "Til Månen & Tilbage" which peaked at number 16 on the Danish Singles Chart. His second single, "Gider dig ikke mer'" peaked at number 19 on the Danish Singles Chart, but went into top 10 on the Danish streaming chart. The single was certified platinum with more than 1.8 million streams. His third single "Fest med de bedst feat. Niklas" didn't make it to the charts, but was certified gold with more than 900.000 streams.

Discography

EP'er
 Seks hjerter (2012)

Singler

"Til månen & tilbage" also appeared in a remix version with Young and James Kayn.

Guest appearances

References

External links

Official website

The X Factor contestants
1989 births
Living people
21st-century Danish male singers
Singers from Aarhus